The Golden Eagle Award for Best Motion Picture is one of twenty award categories presented annually by the National Academy of Motion Pictures Arts and Sciences of Russia. It is one of the Golden Eagle Awards, which were conceived by Nikita Mikhalkov as a counterweight to the Nika Award established in 1987 by the Russian Academy of Cinema Arts and Sciences.

Each year the members of the academy choose five nominees. The first film to be awarded was The Cuckoo, a comedy film about the Winter War between Finland and the Soviet Union during World War II. The most recent award was given to A Siege Diary, in 2020.

Nominees and winners
Key

References

External links
 

Picture
Lists of films by award